William Upton Richards (1811–1873) was an English Anglican priest. He was a prominent Tractarian in the Church of England who served mostly notably as the vicar of All Saints, Margaret Street, London, from 1859 to 1873.

Richards was born 2 March 1811 in Penryn, Cornwall, to William Richards and Elizabeth Rose Thomas. He matriculated from Exeter College, Oxford, in 1829, graduating with a Bachelor of Arts degree in 1833. He was promoted to Master of Arts in 1839. On 22 August 1835 he married Caroline Cazalet at All Souls, St Marylebone, London.

Richards was ordained in the Church of England in 1837. Circa 1848–1851, he supported Harriet Brownlow Byron in the foundation of the Society of All Saints Sisters of the Poor, one of the first Anglican orders for women, at Margaret Street, London; the sisters were employed in nursing the poor and destitute in the parish. He died 16 June 1873 in his home in Regent's Park, London.

See also
 Edward Bouverie Pusey

References

Footnotes

Bibliography

External links
Bibliographic directory from Project Canterbury

1811 births
1873 deaths
19th-century English Anglican priests
19th-century English theologians
Alumni of Exeter College, Oxford
Anglo-Catholic clergy
Anglo-Catholic theologians
People from Penryn, Cornwall
English Anglican theologians
English Anglo-Catholics
Tractarians